Pilata Bigidigala is an Indian Odia movie directed by Basant Sahoo and produced by Pooja Bharalawala. Its music was directed by Prem Anand. The movie is a comedic love story and is a remake of the Punjabi movie Carry On Jatta; which was inspired by the Malayalam movie Chakkikotha Chankaran.

Plot  
Buggi (Sabasachi Mishra) is depicted as a happy-go-lucky guy who lives with his father, Advocate Chaturbhuja Mohanty (Bijay Mohanty), his brother, and sister-in-law. He is friends with Twiter (Papu Pom Pom), who lives with his father Sub-inspector Durjyodhan Sahoo (Kuna Tripathy).

He meets Nisha (Archita Sahu) at his friend Akash's marriage and falls in love with her. While trying to win her heart, Buggi lies to her, telling her he is an orphan. He proposes to her and marries her in the presence of her brother (Biren Mishra). Due to his lie, Buggi was unable to take Nisha home and so he lives in a rented house. She finds Buggi's home for rent, which creates tension for Buggi and Twiter.

To save his marriage and save himself from his family's anger, Buggi introduces Twiter as Nisha's husband. Meanwhile, Twiter marries Mithi, who comes to Buggi's home as their daughter-in-law. Buggi's family assumes Mithi is Buggi's wife, which brings more misery. Buggi explains the situation to Mithi and pleads for help.

Buggi wants to take Nisha out of his house, so he asks Twiter to escape with Mithi. This causes his family members to become angry with Nisha and throw her out of their house. This backfires when family members Buggi, Twiter, Mithi, and Nisha follow them. Seeing the danger, Buggi comes to save them. They finally know the truth from Buggi and plead forgiveness from Nisha. Twiter introduces Mithi to his father (Kuna Tripathy). The movie ends with the title line.

Cast 

Sabyasachi Mishra as Buggi
Archita Sahu as Nisha
Mihir Das
Papu Pom Pom as Twiter
Bijay Mohanty as Advocate Chaturbhuja Mohanty
Kuna Tripathy as Sub-inspector Durjyodhan Sahu
 Jeevan Panda
 Shelly Mishra
 Birendra Ku Mishra
 Lipsa Mishra

Music 
The music was composed by Prem Anand. The singers are Sabyasachi, Bibhu Kishor, Humane Sagar, Sricharan, Sohini Mishra, Sasmita Mishra, and Sanju, among others. Sabyasachi sang the title track "Pila-Taa Bigidi-Galaa".

Soundtrack 
Five tunes made up the soundtrack:
 Nisa Nisa
 Pilata Bigidigala
 Bomata Phuti Gala Re
 Hatara Mehendi
 Nauty Nauty

References

External links
 

2010s Odia-language films
Odia remakes of Punjabi films
Odia remakes of Malayalam films